A national security council (NSC) is usually an executive branch governmental body responsible for coordinating policy on national security issues and advising chief executives on matters related to national security. An NSC is often headed by a national security advisor and staffed with senior-level officials from military, diplomatic, intelligence, law enforcement and other governmental bodies. The functions and responsibilities of an NSC at the strategic state level are different from those of the United Nations Security Council, which is more of a diplomatic forum.

Occasionally a nation will be ruled by a similarly named body, such as "the National Security Committee" or "Council for National Security". These bodies are often a result of the establishment or preservation of a military dictatorship (or some other national crisis), do not always have  statutory approval, and are usually intended to have transitory or provisional powers. See also: coup d'état.

Some nations may have a similar body which is not formally part of the executive government. For example, the National Security Commission in China is an organ of the Chinese Communist Party (CCP), the sole ruling party, and headed by the CCP general secretary, rather than an organ of the executive government.

NSCs by country

 Abkhazia: Security Council
 Algeria: High Council of Security
 Antigua and Barbuda: National Security Council
 Armenia: Security Council of Armenia
 Australia: National Security Committee
 Austria: National Security Council
 Azerbaijan: Security Council
 Bangladesh: National Committee on Security Affairs
 Belarus: Security Council
 Belgium: 
 Brazil: National Defense Council
 Chile: 
 China: National Security Commission of the Chinese Communist Party
 Hong Kong: Committee for Safeguarding National Security of Hong Kong
 Croatia: National Security Council
 Czech Republic: National Security Council of the Czech Republic
 East Germany: National Defense Council of East Germany
 Egypt: 
 Estonia: National Defence Council
 Fiji: National Security Council
 Finland: Ministerial Committee on Foreign and Security Policy
 France: 
 Georgia: National Security Council of Georgia
 Germany:  (Federal Security Council), prior to 1969  (Federal Defense Council)
 Greece:  Government Council for Foreign Affairs and Defence
 Ghana: National Security Council
 India: National Security Council
 Iran, Islamic Republic of: Supreme National Security Council
 Iraq: National Security Council
 Kurdistan Region: Security Council
 Ireland (Republic of): National Security Committee
 Israel: Ministerial Committee on National Security Affairs (policy co-ordination functions); National Security Council (advisory functions)
 Italy: High Council of Defence
 Japan: National Security Council (previously Security Council)
 Kazakhstan: Security Council of Kazakhstan
 Korea, North: State Affairs Commission of North Korea (previously National Defense Commission)
 Korea, South: National Security Council
 Kyrgyzstan: Security Council
 Lithuania: State Defence Council
 Malaysia: National Security Division (policy co-ordination functions);National Security Council (advisory functions)
 Moldova: Supreme Security Council
 Mongolia: National Security Council of Mongolia
 Myanmar: National Defence and Security Council
 New Zealand: Cabinet National Security Committee
 Nigeria: National Security Council (intelligence services); National Defense Council (Nigerian Armed Forces)
 Oman: Palace Office (Oman)
 Pakistan: National Security Council
 Palestinian Authority: Palestinian National Security Council
 Philippines: National Security Council
 Poland: 
 Portugal: Superior Council of National Defense
 Romania: Supreme Council of National Defense
 Russian Federation: Security Council of the Russian Federation
 Saudi Arabia: Council of Political and Security Affairs (previously National Security Council)
 Serbia: National Security Council of the Republic of Serbia
 Slovenia: National Security Council
 Slovak Republic: Security Council
 Spain: National Security Council
 Sri Lanka: National Security Council of Sri Lanka
 Taiwan (Republic of China): National Security Council
 Tajikistan: Security Council
 Thailand: National Security Council
 Turkey: National Security Council
 Turkmenistan: State Security Council
 Ukraine: National Security and Defense Council of Ukraine
 United Kingdom: National Security Council
 United States: United States National Security Council
 Uzbekistan: National Security Council under the President of Uzbekistan
 Vietnam: Council for National Defense and Security

See also
 Privy council
 Council of State
 Executive council (Commonwealth countries)
 Central Military Commission

References

External links

 NATO Cooperative Cyber Defence Centre of Excellence